Seth Ablade (born 30 April 1983 in Teshie) is a Ghanaian retired footballer and a football manager. Ablade played in the premier divisions of Poland, Albania and Finland. He featured for Ghana in the 1999 Under-17 World Cup in New Zealand, winning a bronze medal. 

After his player career Ablade has worked as a manager for the Finnish sides OPS and FC Jazz. He is the father of the footballer Terry Ablade.

References

External links
 
 Seth Ablade at FSHF 
 Seth Ablade at Ghanaweb

1983 births
Living people
Ghanaian footballers
Association football midfielders
Ghanaian expatriate footballers
Expatriate footballers in Austria
SVG Bleiburg players
Ghanaian expatriate sportspeople in Austria
FC Kärnten players
Expatriate footballers in Poland
Polonia Warsaw players
Ghanaian expatriate sportspeople in Poland
Expatriate footballers in Albania
KF Elbasani players
Ghanaian expatriate sportspeople in Albania
Expatriate footballers in Finland
Veikkausliiga players
Ekstraklasa players
AC Oulu players
Ghanaian expatriate sportspeople in Finland
Kuopion Palloseura players
Oulun Palloseura players